Øistein Jakobsen (27 February 1907 – 15 September 1947) was a Norwegian politician for the Liberal Party.

He served as a deputy representative to the Norwegian Parliament from Troms during the term 1945–1949. He died midway into the term.

References

1907 births
1947 deaths
Liberal Party (Norway) politicians
Deputy members of the Storting